Irish euro coins all share the same design by Jarlath Hayes, that of the harp, a traditional symbol for Ireland since the Middle Ages, based on that of the Brian Boru harp, housed in Trinity College Dublin. The same harp is used as on the official seals of the Taoiseach, and government ministers and the Seal of the President of Ireland. The coins' design also features the 12 stars of the EU, the year of issue and the Irish name for Ireland, "Éire", in a traditional Gaelic script.

Irish euro design

All Irish euro coins bear the same design on their obverse side: a Celtic harp based on the Trinity College Harp, flanked to the left and right by the word "ÉIRE" (Irish for Ireland) and the year the coin was struck, written in Gaelic type. These in turn are surrounded by the 12 stars of the flag of Europe. On the one-euro coin the stars appear on the gold coloured surround with the harp and words in the silver coloured centre. The colours are in the reverse for the two euro coin.

Circulating mintage quantities

The following table shows the mintage quantity for all Irish euro coins, per denomination, per year.

Commemorative coins

Limited release in 2010, featuring an Irish hunter horse and foal.

Limited release in 2011, featuring a salmon and smolt.

Limited release in 2012, featuring an Irish wolfhound and pup.

Wide release (in common with all Euro nations) in 2007, commemorating the 50th anniversary of the Treaty of Rome.

Wide release (in common with all Euro nations) in 2009, commemorating the 10th anniversary of the Economic and Monetary Union.

Wide release (in common with all Euro nations) in 2012, commemorating the 10th anniversary of the euro coins and banknotes.

Wide release (in common with all Euro nations) in 2015, commemorating the 30th anniversary of adoption of the European flag by the European Economic Community.

Wide release in 2016, with the figure of Hibernia, commemorating the centenary of the Easter Rising.

Wide release in 2019, commemorating the centenary of the First Dáil.

Usage of 1 cent and 2 cent coins

As 1c and 2c coins are of comparatively low value, a National Payments Plan prepared by the Central Bank of Ireland approved by the Government in April 2013 plans "to trial the use of a rounding convention in a pilot project in a mid-size Irish town", with the 1c and 2c no longer being minted while remaining legal tender. The cost of producing a 1 cent coin is 1.65c and the cost of producing a 2 cent coin is 1.94c.

Beginning on Wednesday 28 October 2015 Ireland followed The Netherlands, Sweden, Finland, Denmark, Hungary and, in introducing so-called Swedish rounding. While individual prices are still shown and summed up with 1-cent precision, the total sum is then rounded to the nearest 5 cents when paying with cash. Sums ending in 1, 2, 6 and 7 cents are rounded down; sums ending in 3, 4, 8 and 9 cents are rounded up.

The 1 cent and 2 cent coins remain legal tender, and rounding is voluntary for both the customer and retailer, the Central Bank of Ireland advises "for Rounding to happen, both the retailer and the customer must accept it; both will have the right to use exact change".

Rounding applies only to cash payments and does not apply to bills paid electronically - by debit card, credit card or by store card.

See also

 Coins of the Republic of Ireland
 Identifying marks on euro coins

References

External links
European Central Bank – Ireland

Euro coins by issuing country
euro coins
Currencies of the Republic of Ireland
euro coins
Euro